Each member of this infinite family of uniform polyhedron compounds is a symmetric arrangement of prisms sharing a common axis of rotational symmetry.

This infinite family can be enumerated as follows:
For each positive integer n≥1 and for each rational number p/q>2 (expressed with p and q coprime), there occurs the compound of n p/q-gonal prisms, with symmetry group Dnph.

References 
.

Polyhedral compounds